The women's freestyle 55 kilograms wrestling competition at the 2006 Asian Games in Doha was held on 11 December 2006 at the Aspire Hall 4.

This freestyle wrestling competition consisted of a single-elimination tournament, with a repechage used to determine the winner of two bronze medals. The two finalists faced off for gold and silver medals. Each wrestler who lost to one of the two finalists moved into the repechage, culminating in a pair of bronze medal matches featuring the semifinal losers each facing the remaining repechage opponent from their half of the bracket.

Each bout consisted of up to three rounds, lasting two minutes apiece. The wrestler who scored more points in each round was the winner of that rounds; the bout finished when one wrestler had won two rounds (and thus the match).

Schedule
All times are Arabia Standard Time (UTC+03:00)

Results 
Legend
F — Won by fall

Main bracket

Repechage

Final standing

References
Results
FILA Database

Wrestling at the 2006 Asian Games